Lasiurini is a tribe of bats in the family Vespertilionidae. It contains three genera of bats found in the Americas. All three genera were previously considered one genus, Lasiurus, but have since been split from one another. However, the validity of this split is still debated.

Species 
Species in the tribe include:

 Genus Aeorestes – hoary bats
 Hoary bat, Aeorestes cinereus
 Big red bat, Aeorestes egregius
 Hawaiian hoary bat, Aeorestes semotus
 South American hoary bat, Aeorestes villosissimus
 Genus Dasypterus – yellow bats
 Southern yellow bat, Dasypterus ega
 Cuban yellow bat, Dasypterus insularis
 Northern yellow bat, Dasypterus intermedius
 Western yellow bat, Dasypterus xanthinus
 Genus Lasiurus – red or hairy-tailed bats
 Arequipa red bat, Lasiurus arequipae
 Greater red bat, Lasiurus atratus
 Southern red bat, Lasiurus blossevillii
 Eastern red bat, Lasiurus borealis
 Tacarcuna bat, Lasiurus castaneus
 Jamaican red bat, Lasiurus degelidus
 Hairy-tailed bat, Lasiurus ebenus
 Western red bat, Lasiurus frantzii
 Minor red bat, Lasiurus minor
 Pfeiffer's red bat, Lasiurus pfeifferi
 Seminole bat, Lasiurus seminolus
 Cinnamon red bat, Lasiurus varius

References 

Mammal tribes
Vesper bats
Taxa named by George Henry Hamilton Tate